Eleni Doika (born ) is a Greek group rhythmic gymnast. She represents her nation at international competitions. 

She participated at the 2012 Summer Olympics in London. She also competed at world championships, including at the 2011, 2013, 2014 and 2015 World Rhythmic Gymnastics Championships. She also competed at the 2015 European Games in Baku.

She was part of the Greek rhythmic gymnastics team at the 2016 Summer Olympics in Rio de Janeiro. The team finished 13th in qualification and did not advance to the final.

References

External links

https://database.fig-gymnastics.com/public/gymnasts/biography/18844/true?backUrl=
http://www.bbc.co.uk/sport/olympics/2012/athletes/518e2134-0e83-445f-af76-69d161899741
http://george-islandnews.blogspot.com/2012/01/young-corfiot-eleni-doika-qualifies-for.html
http://www.espn.com/olympics/summer/2016/athletes/_/athlete/49780
http://www.intlgymnast.com/index.php?option=com_content&view=article&id=3349:fig-releases-official-olympic-roster&catid=92:2012-olympic-news&Itemid=242

1995 births
Living people
Greek rhythmic gymnasts
Place of birth missing (living people)
Gymnasts at the 2012 Summer Olympics
Olympic gymnasts of Greece
Gymnasts at the 2015 European Games
European Games competitors for Greece
21st-century Greek women